The savanna dwarf shrew (Crocidura nanilla) is a species of mammal in the family Soricidae. It is found in Guinea, Kenya, Mauritania, Senegal, Tanzania, and Uganda. Its natural habitat is savanna.

References
 Hutterer, R. 2004.  Crocidura nanilla.   2006 IUCN Red List of Threatened Species.   Downloaded on 30 July 2007.

Crocidura
Mammals described in 1909
Taxa named by Oldfield Thomas
Taxonomy articles created by Polbot